Palaquium majas is a tree in the family Sapotaceae. The specific epithet majas is from the Dayak word for the orang-utan of Borneo, referring to the brownish indumentum.

Description
The bark is brown. Inflorescences bear up to eight flowers.

Distribution and habitat
Palaquium majas is endemic to Borneo. Its habitat is lowland mixed dipterocarp forest from sea level to  altitude.

References

majas
Endemic flora of Borneo
Trees of Borneo
Plants described in 1925